Kaziranga University (KU), officially established as The Assam Kaziranga University, is a private university located at Koraikhowa, on the outskirts of city Jorhat in Assam, India. It was established in 2012 through The Assam Kaziranga University Act, 2012 created under Assam Private Universities Act 2007.

About
Founded in 2012, The Assam Kaziranga University well known as KU is one of the largest private universities in North-East India. The Assam Kaziranga University has been established under the Assam Private University Act No. XII of 2007, offering state-of-the-art education and research relevant to market needs. The University has been promoted by the Trust under the banner of The North Eastern Knowledge Foundation (NEKF) and founded in the year 2012 by the Khetan Industrial Group.
The social sensitivity and responsible entrepreneurship of both the groups have helped them to imbibe a culture of proedification in their endeavour and give back the knowledge and experience to the society that they have gathered over years of service to the nation.

The TAKU insignia attempts to visualize the guiding mission and driving spirit of the University. The one-horned rhino, available nowhere else in the world but the Kaziranga belt, symbolizes uniqueness. It also stands for steadfast concentration in one's pursuit, overcoming obstacles of all kind coming in the way.

The one-horned rhino in the logo represents a confident and disciplined lifestyle that is not drifting aimlessly, but is respectfully connected to its roots. The sun on the top right corner, the timeless star of life, symbolizes knowledge as the eternal source of enlightenment. Overall, the shield is supposed to protect us from the invasion of ignorance in our lifelong pursuit of true knowledge and its humanist applications beyond.
The golden border hints at the shining glory that rewards every stellar performance upon completion.

Campus
The KU campus is located at Koraikhowa, on the outskirts of Jorhat city near NH 37. The campus is very conveniently connected with air, rail and road transport.

Organisation
The University provides courses in Engineering, Management, Computing Sciences, Social Sciences, Health Sciences, Pharmacy and Basic sciences. It has seven constituent schools: 
 Ku school of  Basic Sciences
 KU School of Business
 KU school of Computing Sciences
 KU School of Engineering and Technology
 KU school of Health Sciences
 KU School of Social Sciences
 KU School of Pharmacy

References 

Universities in Assam
Educational institutions established in 2012
Private universities in India
Education in Jorhat district
Jorhat district
2012 establishments in Assam